David Frankel (born April 2, 1959) is an American filmmaker. He directed the 2006 film The Devil Wears Prada, as well as Marley & Me (2008), Hope Springs (2012), Jerry & Marge Go Large (2022), and the first and fourth episodes of the Netflix miniseries Inventing Anna (2022).

Biography
Frankel was born to a Jewish family in New York City. He is the son of Tobia Simone (née Brown) and Max Frankel, a former executive editor of The New York Times and columnist.

He won the Academy Award for Best Live Action Short Film for his 1996 short film Dear Diary and an Emmy for Outstanding Directing for a Comedy Series for the pilot episode of Entourage (2004), and has since directed the studio films The Devil Wears Prada (2006), Marley & Me (2008), and Hope Springs (2012). His birdwatching comedy The Big Year, starring Steve Martin, Owen Wilson, JoBeth Williams, and Jack Black, was released in October 2011. He directed the 2022 film Jerry & Marge Go Large, starring Bryan Cranston and Annette Bening.

As of 2008, he lives in Coconut Grove, Florida.

Filmography

Feature films

Executive Producer
 The Short Game (2013) (Documentary)
 Chronically Metropolitan (2016)

Short films

Television

References

External links
 
 David Frankel at Rotten Tomatoes
 David Frankel at The New York Times

1959 births
Film producers from New York (state)
American male screenwriters
American television directors
American male television writers
Directors of Live Action Short Film Academy Award winners
Primetime Emmy Award winners
Living people
Writers from New York City
Harvard College alumni
Film directors from New York City
Screenwriters from New York (state)
American people of German-Jewish descent
Screenwriters from Florida
Film directors from Florida
Film producers from Florida
21st-century American screenwriters
Television producers from New York (state)
Television producers from Florida
20th-century American screenwriters